Vegard Robinson Bugge (born 7 December 1989 in Horten) is a Norwegian former professional cyclist.

Major results

2007
 3rd Time trial, National Junior Road Championships
2009
 3rd Road race, National Under-23 Road Championships
2010
 2nd Road race, National Under-23 Road Championships
 8th Rogaland Grand Prix
2011
 1st  Road race, National Under-23 Road Championships
 3rd Overall Tour of Norway
 6th Ronde van Vlaanderen U23
2012
 5th Overall Ronde de l'Oise
2013
 1st Gooikse Pijl
2014
 10th Overall Tour de Bretagne
2015
 1st  Mountains classification Tour of Norway
 4th GP Horsens

References

External links

1989 births
Living people
People from Horten
Norwegian male cyclists
Sportspeople from Vestfold og Telemark